QBS may refer to:

 QBS (band), second official sub-group of South Korean girl group T-ara
 Qbs (build tool), cross-platform free and open-source software for managing the build process of software
 QBS-09, a military shotgun produced by Chinese company Norinco. 
 Quota Borda system, a multi-winner election method, proposed by Michael Dummett